Riverdale North is an electoral district which elects a Member of the Legislative Assembly (MLA) to the Legislative Assembly of the Yukon Territory in Canada.  Along with Riverdale South, it makes up the subdivision of Whitehorse of Riverdale. The district also includes the residents of Long Lake Road.

Riverdale North is bordered by the Whitehorse ridings of Riverdale South, Whitehorse Centre, Takhini-Kopper King, Porter Creek North, and Porter Creek Centre, as well as the rural riding of Mount Lorne-Southern Lakes.

MLAs

Election history

2021 general election

2016 general election

|-

|-
!align=left colspan=3|Total
!align=right|1117
!align=right|100.0%
!align=right| –

2011 general election

|-

|-
!align=left colspan=3|Total
!align=right|986
!align=right|100.0%
!align=right| –

2006 general election

|-

|Liberal
|Lesley Cabott
|align="right"|373
|align="right"|38.3%
|align="right"|+3.6%

|NDP
|James McCullough
|align="right"|172
|align="right"|17.6%
|align="right"|-4.2%
|-
!align=left colspan=3|Total
!align=right|974
!align=right|100.0%
!align=right| –

2002 general election

|-

|Liberal
|Dale Eftoda
|align="right"|355
|align="right"|34.7%
|align="right"|-18.2%

|NDP
|Jan Slipetz
|align="right"|223
|align="right"|21.8%
|align="right"|-5.3%
|-
!align=left colspan=3|Total
!align=right|1024
!align=right|100.0%
!align=right| –

2000 general election

|-

|style="width: 130px" |Liberal
|Dale Eftoda
|align="right"|454
|align="right"|52.9%
|align="right"|+37.4%

|NDP
|Rachael Lewis
|align="right"|233
|align="right"|27.1%
|align="right"|-9.7%

|-
!align=left colspan=3|Total
!align=right|859
!align=right|100.0%
!align=right| –

1996 general election

|-

|NDP
|Dave Stockdale
|align="right"|347
|align="right"|36.8%
|align="right"|+6.2%

|Liberal
|Flo Leblanc-Hutchinson
|align="right"|146
|align="right"|15.5%
|align="right"|+4.4%
|-
!align=left colspan=3|Total
!align=right|943
!align=right|100.0%
!align=right| –

1992 general election

|-

|NDP
|Lucy Van Oldenbarneveld
|align="right"|292
|align="right"|30.6%
|align="right"| –

|Liberal
|Lesley Cabott
|align="right"|106
|align="right"|11.1%
|align="right"| –
|- bgcolor="white"
!align="left" colspan=3|Total
!align="right"|955
!align="right"|100.0%
!align="right"| –

References

Yukon territorial electoral districts
Politics of Whitehorse